is a railway station located in Higashiyama-ku, Kyoto, Kyoto Prefecture, Japan. It has the Keihan station number "KH36", and the JR West station number "JR-D02".

Lines
Keihan Electric Railway
Keihan Main Line
West Japan Railway Company
Nara Line

Layout
The station is located on the ground level. The Keihan and JR sections have two side platforms each. The Demachiyanagi-bound platform of the Keihan station and the Nara-bound one of the JR station are on the same structure, but were separated by a wall. On November 6, 2011, the transfer ticket gates were located between those platforms and the gates are open from 7am until 7pm. Outside of these hours, passengers must walk on a bridge between the platforms.

Keihan Railway

JR West

Passenger statistics
The Keihan station was used by 14,442 passengers per day in 2012.
The JR West station was used by 16,055 passengers per day in fiscal 2012.
According to the Kyoto City statistics and Kyoto Prefecture statistics, the average number of passengers per day is as follows.

History
The station opened on 15 April 1910, when the operation of the Keihan Main Line started. The track of the Nara Line (originally the old route of the Tōkaidō Main Line) ran next to the station, but the station on the JNR line was not made until 27 December 1957. The Nara Line station on the single track line had only one platform and no passing loop until the second platform was completed in July 1994. The Nara Line was double-tracked in March 2001.

Station numbering was introduced to the JR West station in March 2018 with Tōfukuji being assigned station number JR-D02.

Adjacent stations

References

External links

JR West station information 
Keihan station information 

Railway stations in Japan opened in 1910
Railway stations in Kyoto